Kilcornan is an abandoned village and National Monument located in County Galway, Ireland.

Location

Kilcornan is located 2.5 km (1½ mile) northeast of Athenry.

History and archaeology
Kilcornan was abandoned around the late 18th century. The field layouts and walls are clearly visible on aerial photographs.

References

Archaeological sites in County Galway
National Monuments in County Galway